The men's super-G competition of the Vancouver 2010 Olympics was held at Whistler Creekside in Whistler, British Columbia, on Friday, February 19.

The defending Olympic champion was Kjetil André Aamodt of Norway, since retired, and the reigning world champion was Didier Cuche of Switzerland. Norway's Aksel Lund Svindal was the defending World Cup Super-G champion and led the current season, ahead of Michael Walchhofer of Austria and Cuche.

Svindal won the gold medal, Bode Miller of the United States took the silver, and the bronze medalist was U.S. teammate Andrew Weibrecht; Cuche was tenth and Walchhofer was 21st. Svindal and Miller had both medaled in the downhill, each one place lower, behind Didier Défago, who was fifteenth in the super-G.

The course was labelled as technically difficult, and eighteen did not finish the race. Patrik Järbyn of Sweden crashed badly during the race, flying in the air and landing heavily on his back. He suffered a concussion and was transferred to a hospital.

Results 
The race was started at 11:30 local time, (UTC −8).

References

External links 
 2010 Winter Olympics results: Men's Super-G, from https://web.archive.org/web/20091025194336/http://www.vancouver2010.com/; retrieved 2010-02-19.
Results
FIS results

Super-G
Winter Olympics